The Diocese of Papantla is a Latin Church ecclesiastical territory or diocese of the Catholic Church in Mexico. It was erected 24 November 1922 and based in the Mexican city of Papantla, Veracruz. The diocese is a suffragan in the ecclesiastical province of the metropolitan Archdiocese of Xalapa. Along with the Dioceses of Huejutla, Tulancingo and Tampico, it lost territory in 1962 to form the Diocese of Tuxpan.

Bishops

Ordinaries
Nicolás Corona y Corona (1922–1950) 
Luis Cabrera Cruz (1950–1958), appointed Bishop of San Luis Potosí
Alfonso Sánchez Tinoco (1959–1970) 
Sergio Obeso Rivera (1971–1974), appointed Coadjutor Archbishop of Jalapa (Xalapa), Veracruz; future Cardinal
Genaro Alamilla Arteaga (1974–1980) 
Lorenzo Cárdenas Aregullín (1980–2012)
Jorge Carlos Patron Wong (2012–2013); formerly served as Coadjutor Bishop to Bishop Aregullín; named Secretary of the Congregation for the Clergy on September 21, 2013 and became an archbishop
José Trinidad Zapata Ortiz (2014-

Coadjutor bishop
Jorge Carlos Patrón Wong (2009-2012)

Episcopal see
Teziutlán, Puebla: In 1901, the see was changed to Teziutlán, in Eastern Puebla, near to the border with Veracruz.

External links and references

Papantla
Papantla, Roman Catholic Diocese of
Papantla
Papantla